The Big Killing is a 1928 American comedy silent film directed by F. Richard Jones and written by Frank Butler. The film stars Wallace Beery, Raymond Hatton, Anders Randolf, Mary Brian, Gardner James, Lane Chandler and Paul McAllister. The film was released on July 1, 1928, by Paramount Pictures.

Cast 
Wallace Beery as Powderhorn Pete
Raymond Hatton as Deadeye Dan
Anders Randolf as Old Man Beagle
Mary Brian	as Old Man Beagle's Daughter, Mary Beagle
Gardner James as Jim Hicks
Lane Chandler as George Hicks
Paul McAllister as Old Man Hicks
James Mason as First Beagle Son 
Ralph Yearsley as Second Beagle Son
Ethan Laidlaw as Third Beagle Son 
Leo Willis	as Fourth Beagle Son
Buck Moulton as Fifth Beagle Son
Bob Kortman as Sixth Beagle Son
Walter James as Sheriff
Tiny Ward as Barker

Preservation status
The film survives in the Library of Congress collections.

References

External links 
 
 

1928 films
1920s English-language films
Silent American comedy films
1928 comedy films
Paramount Pictures films
Films directed by F. Richard Jones
American black-and-white films
American silent feature films
1920s American films